The purplish honeycreeper (Chlorophanes purpurascens) is a bird in the Thraupidae, or tanager family.  It is known only from the type specimen, a trade-skin held in the British Museum, and is thought to be an intergeneric hybrid between the green honeycreeper (Chlorophanes spiza) and either the red-legged honeycreeper (Cyanerpes cyaneus) or the blue dacnis (Dacnis cayana), though Hellmayr, in his Catalogue of birds of the Americas and the adjacent islands, considered it a good species.

The type locality on the specimen's label was given as Caracas in Venezuela.  However Storer, when discussing the specimen and the characteristics of its preparation, suggested that it was more likely to derive from the Paria Peninsula of northern Venezuela.

References

purplish honeycreeper
Birds of Venezuela
Bird hybrids
Controversial bird taxa
purplish honeycreeper
purplish honeycreeper
purplish honeycreeper
Intergeneric hybrids
Tanagers